Élan School was a private, coeducational, and controversial residential behavior modification program and therapeutic boarding school in Poland, Androscoggin County, Maine. It was a full member of the National Association of Therapeutic Schools and Programs (NATSAP).

The facility was closed down on April 1, 2011, due to reports of abuse, many from former students, dating back to its opening in 1970.

Élan was located on a  campus that was formerly a hunting lodge. There were also other campuses, such as the one on 424 Maplecrest Road in Parsonsfield, Maine, which was formerly a hotel and hospital before it was bought by Élan in 1975. This campus was known to have some of the worst abuse in the school's history, and has been said to have been put out of use sometime in the 1980s.

The school acquired some notoriety during the 1990s and early 2000s when former classmates of Michael Skakel, who had attended Élan in the 1970s, testified against him in his trial for an unsolved murder that had occurred about two years before he enrolled at Élan. The school was also the subject of persistent allegations of abuse in their behavioral modification program.

History 
Élan School was founded in 1970 by  psychiatrist Gerald Davidson, investor David Goldberg, and Joseph Ricci, a former heroin addict who had worked with young people in drug-treatment facilities (and who in 1979 would become owner of the Scarborough Downs racetrack). Ricci headed the school until his death in 2001, when his widow Sharon Terry took over. Maine politician Bill Diamond served as its Director of Governmental Relations.

Program 
In the school's program, described as "controversial", 'humiliation' was identified as a therapeutic tool, as was following up on such intervention with encouragement and warm support.  Students attended year-round. In 2002, a New Jersey educational consultant who had referred students to Élan for 22 years told The New York Times that he would refer only "the most serious cases" to the school, which he said would "take kids who haven't responded to other programs and who are really out of control."

The school's treatment methods were based on the "TC" or therapeutic community modality popularized in the 1960s at facilities such as Synanon, and later at Daytop Village.

In 2002, a New Jersey educational consultant told The New York Times that the school was "certainly not for the faint-hearted." He said "There's lots of confrontation, ... and yet there are lots of hugs." Accounts of former students include mentions of physical and mental abuse, including degrading tasks such as "[sessions] of cleaning urinals with a toothbrush that can last for hours" and up to the point of critical malnourishment.

Controversies
Throughout its history, the school was faced with numerous allegations of student maltreatment. In 2001, Details magazine cited Élan as "among the most controversial of the nation's residential therapeutic communities."

In 1975, Illinois state officials removed 11 children from the Élan program, alleging mistreatment.

In the late 1970s, Androscoggin County Sheriff's Office Lieutenant Max Ashburn visited the school after repeatedly hearing rumors of abuse, but the staff did not allow him entry into the school past the lobby. Following this, he began keeping a file in which he documented names and phone numbers related to Élan, as well as reported abuses.

In 2002 during the trial of Michael Skakel, an Élan alumnus, witnesses testified that beatings and public humiliation were parts of life at Élan during the late 1970s. In trial testimony, former students also described the practice of placing a student in a "boxing ring" surrounded by classmates who confronted the student. The New York Times has reported that, at the school, "smiling without permission can lead to a session of cleaning urinals with a toothbrush that can last for hours."

The New York State Education Department, which has paid tuition for special education students to attend Élan School, gave the school a favorable review in 2005. In 2007, however, New York education officials raised questions about the school's practices, alleging in a letter to the school and Maine education officials that Élan students were physically restraining their peers and being deprived of sleep. The allegations prompted the state of New York to threaten to withdraw tuition money for taxpayer-funded students. The school's lawyer contested the allegations.

In March 2016, Maine State Police announced they had opened a cold case investigation into the death of former Élan resident Phil Williams, who died on December 27, 1982, after participating in Élan's "ring," where students were forced to fight each other as a means of behavior modification. The State Police later announced no charges would be filed as a result of their investigation, citing insufficient evidence.

Runaways
Students would occasionally run away from Élan. Former Androscoggin County Sheriff's Office Captain Ray Lafrance stated that Élan would send groups in vans to search for and return runaways, and noted that the school only called police to report missing students as a last resort. Lafrance said some runaways would be relieved to be found after spending nights in the woods, though others "were scared to death to go back to Élan. If we really felt they were really scared, we'd bring them into the department, call their parents and at least let them know what's going on. Then we'd call Élan and they'd come pick them up."

In 1979, Lt. Max Ashburn was called by a local family to pick up a 16-year-old Élan runaway. The boy had been a student at Élan for several months, and said that his parents lived in another state. Ashburn recalled in 2016 that the boy "was crying, and he was begging me not to take him back"; rather than return him to the school, Ashburn, a former truck driver, took the boy to a local diner, and instructed him to hitch a ride with one of the truck drivers there.

In July 1990, 15-year-old runaway Brad Glickman of Bedford, New York, visited the home of Todd and Audrey Blaylock in Norway, Maine, after meeting one of Audrey Blaylock's daughters. Glickman told those he met that his name was David Smith. Roy O'Hara, a resident at the house, was handling a revolver when it discharged, fatally shooting Glickman in the heart. O'Hara was found guilty of manslaughter that November; however, the verdict would be partially overturned in 1993.

On March 21, 1993, 17-year-old student Dawn Marie Birnbaum ran away from Élan during a school outing. On March 24, she was found dead in a snowbank near Interstate 80. 36-year-old James Robert Cruz Jr. was charged with the first-degree murder of Birnbaum, and sentenced to life in prison.

Closure
On March 23, 2011, Élan School announced it would be closing on April 1, 2011. The school's owner, Sharon Terry, blamed "declining enrollment and resulting financial difficulties," as well as negative attacks on the school via the Internet. In a letter to the Lewiston Sun-Journal, Terry said: "The school has been the target of harsh and false attacks spread over the Internet with the avowed purpose of forcing the school to close." She added that "the school has, unfortunately, been unable to survive the damage."

In media
Élan was featured in Children of Darkness, a documentary film shot in 1983 that explored the experiences of emotionally troubled youth and the various residences and institutions that housed them.

A documentary chronicling the school's history and impact titled The Last Stop was released in 2017. The film was directed by an Élan graduate and included interviews from various residents and professionals including Maia Szalavitz.

Élan is the main location for the events in Joe versus Elan School, a web-based graphic novel.

Notable alumni
 Tiffany Sedaris, artist, and sister of Amy Sedaris and David Sedaris. Tiffany's two years at Élan are cited in her siblings' writings and interviews as deeply traumatic to her, and a direct cause of her inability to form normal relationships with her family members. After decades of struggling with mental illness, Tiffany ultimately died by suicide in May 2013.
 Michael Skakel, convicted in the murder of Martha Moxley. The case drew media attention largely because Skakel is related to the Kennedy family.
 Ben Weasel, of the punk rock band Screeching Weasel.
 Phil Williams Jr. died at age 15, after being forced to participate in the school's notorious boxing-ring punishment.

See also

 Attack therapy
 Human Potential Movement
 Judge Rotenberg Educational Center
 Large Group Awareness Training

References

External links
 
 Kevin Gray, Bad Company: The Elan School, Details magazine, November 2001, pp. 88–97
 David Gurliacci, Ex-students at Skakel trial describe Elan as 'horrific', Portland Press Herald, May 31, 2002
 Todd Nilssen: The Last Stop (documentary, 2017)

Further reading 
  An unauthorized biography of the founder of the Élan School, Joe Ricci.
  Describes Élan's program under a fictitious name.
  A former senior fellow of the Statistical Assessment Service at George Mason University offers a thoroughly researched critique of the troubled-teen industry, which includes an ethical guide for parents with troubled teenagers.

Boarding schools in Maine
Child abuse in the United States
Cults
Educational institutions established in 1970
Educational institutions disestablished in 2011
Human rights abuses in the United States
Private high schools in Maine
Schools in Androscoggin County, Maine
Therapeutic boarding schools in the United States
Therapeutic community